These are the official results of the Women's Mountainbike Race at the 1996 Summer Olympics in Atlanta, Georgia. There were a total number of 27 participants, with two non-finishers, in this inaugural Olympic event, over 31.8 kilometres, held on July 30, 1996. The mountain biking events were held at the Georgia International Horse Park in Conyers, Georgia, located 30 miles (50 km) east of Atlanta.

Final classification

See also
 Men's Cross Country Race

References

External links
 Official Report

Cycling at the 1996 Summer Olympics
1996 Women
Olym
Cyc